Henry E. Taylor III (born January 24, 1991) is an American actor, host, entrepreneur, host, producer, and director. Better known by his stage name, Henry The III was born in St. Louis, Missouri and raised in Los Angeles, California. At age five Henry and his family moved to California to pursue his career in acting.

Life and career

Henry The III is an actor, on-air-personality, host, producer, and director. His television and film appearances include Shredderman Rules Cougar Town. Some Other works include: The Legend of John Henry - Walt Disney Forest Whitaker, Power Pellet, Buckwald Films (Luke Wahl), Black Olive - Stage 52, One Sunday Morning (Voice Over) - Oblate Media, Lil' Corey featuring Lil Romeo - Fat Cats, Just My Luck Pilot, Without Pants - Oxygen Media, ABC's of Health & Love - Paramount Pictures (Natures Hotline, Ready Rangers - Ready Rangers Production (Charlotte Purein, Take 2 News - ABC KTVI St. Louis, Missouri.  Henry became as serious Commercial actor, with over 50 National Commercials  a list of a few include: Citi Bank, Dr. Pepper, McDonald's, Pepsi, Go-Gurt, Parents In Charge, VW Passat, Honda(2), General Motors (2), Adidas and many more.  He is a member of Delta Sigma Phi and Alumni Film Graduate, with his BS  at Woodbury University.

Filmography

Film and Television

Director
 Monstarz (2014)
 Love Not Equal To LA (2015)

Producer
Monstarz (2014)
Love Not Equal To LA (2015)

Awards and nominations

References

External links

 Review of the film in The New York Times

1991 births
Male actors from Missouri
Living people
21st-century American male actors
Male actors from St. Louis
American male child actors
African-American male actors
American male television actors
American male film actors
American male voice actors
African-American film directors
African-American film producers
Film producers from Missouri
American film directors
American music video directors
Woodbury University alumni
21st-century African-American people